Karin Gayer (born 1969 in Mödling near Vienna) is an Austrian writer. She published poetry and narrative fiction.

Biography
Karin Gayer was born 1969 in Mödling while she is living today in Vienna. She began to study psychology but interrupted and ended her studies because she “could not find what she was searching for”. She is an educated publishing assistant and a free lector. Karin Gayer began to write literature at school. She published in Austrian and German literary magazines, in anthologies and on the radio. Her first book made its appearance in 2002 and was published by Arovell Verlag. Her figures often are outsiders, who question the conventional ones. Her themes revolve around self and foreign knowledge between melancholy and subtle irony.

Publications
Flechtwerk, poetry and small prose, Arovell Verlag, Gosau 2002, 
Vorgänge im Labyrinth, poetry and prose (with 3 co-authors) Arovell Verlag, Gosau 2004, 
Nachtfieber, novel, Arovell Verlag, Gosau 2009, 
Innenaußenwelten, poetry, Edition Art Science, St. Wolfgang 2013, 
Separation, stories, Arovell Verlag, Vienna/Gosau 2019,

Notes

External links

Karin Gayer in the German National Library catalogue
Arovell Verlag, Gosau (Upper Austria)
Website of the author

Austrian women writers
German-language writers
People from Mödling
1969 births
Living people